Edelmiro A. Amante, Sr. (April 21, 1933 – March 10, 2013), was a Filipino politician.

Early life
Amante was born in Butuan. He attended Ampayon Elementary School, then Mindanao Institute, where he graduated from high school as a salutatorian. He then studied at Silliman University, where he received an Associate in Arts degree in 1954, then a Bachelor of Laws in 1958.

Career
Amante started his career as a barrio lieutenant in Ampayon, Butuan. He held that position for only one year, 1959, before becoming a Councilor, from 1960 to 1964. He represented Agusan del Norte at the 1973 Constitutional Convention. He had also represented Agusan del Norte as an Assemblyman of the defunct Batasang Pambansa from 1978 to 1984. Since 1984, he has been elected to four terms to the House of Representatives representing the 2nd District of Agusan del Norte. He was most recently elected in 2007, succeeding his daughter Angelica.

Amante was a close ally of President Fidel Ramos, under whose administration he served as the Executive Secretary in 1995. He currently is a member of the KAMPI party.

References

 

20th-century Filipino lawyers
People from Agusan del Norte
1933 births
2013 deaths
Kabalikat ng Malayang Pilipino politicians
Members of the House of Representatives of the Philippines from Agusan del Norte
Executive Secretaries of the Philippines
Ramos administration cabinet members
Silliman University alumni
Members of the Batasang Pambansa
Recipients of the Presidential Medal of Merit (Philippines)